Jennie Brand may refer to:

 Jennie Brand-Miller (born 1952), Australian nutritionist
 Jennie E. Brand (born 1976), American sociologist and social statistician